Michael Henderson is an Australian former professional rugby league footballer who played in the 2000s and 2010s.

Playing career
Henderson played for the St. George Illawarra Dragons from 2003 to 2006. He then signed with the Gold Coast Titans and was a part of the inaugural Gold Coast Titans team that debuted on 18 March 2007. 

He then broke his leg during a game for the Gold Coast Titans in 2007, but returned the following year and performed well enough to have his contract extended until 2012.  Henderson played for the Gold Coast in their 2009 and 2010 finals campaigns.  

Henderson played 16 games for the Gold Coast in the 2011 NRL season as the club finished last on the table and claimed the wooden spoon.   

Henderson returned to St. George Illawarra for the 2013 season but due to several reoccurring injuries was forced to retire from the NRL after only making one further appearance for the club.

References

Sources
 Whiticker, Alan & Hudson, Glen (2006) The Encyclopedia of Rugby League Players, Gavin Allen Publishing, Sydney

External links
Gold Coast Titans Profile

1984 births
Living people
Australian rugby league players
Gold Coast Titans players
Illawarra Cutters players
Rugby league players from Griffith, New South Wales
Rugby league props
Rugby league second-rows
St. George Illawarra Dragons players